Souvenir Souvenir is an animated documentary short film directed by Bastien Dubois and produced by Amiel Tenenbaum, Simon Pénochet and Bastien Dubois. The short has been awarded in a number of festivals including in Clermont-Ferrand Festival, Seattle International Film Festival, Short Film Award and Sundance Film Festival and won an Annie Award in Best Short Subject category in 2021. It has been shortlisted for the Academy Award for Best Animated Short Film.

Production 
This animated documentary is based on true facts about the Algerian war, intertwined with the director's family life and most of the voices are narrated by the characters themselves. The use of layers and superpositions by paint, blurry and grainy textures by the illustrator Jorge Gonzales match the layers of secrecy of the narrative. The film has two styles: a cartoony 2D animation, made by Train-Train studio and 3D models that mimic 2D hand-drawing and textures. Details were also added by hand-dray and TV paint.

Plot 
For ten years, a filmmaker attempts to make a movie out of his grandfather's Algerian war souvenirs. Both a historical denial and family taboo, the questions raised by the topic fail be answered, and both personal and collective memory are left unsaid. The narrative shifts from the incapacity to speak to the ability to ask the right question, and less about the grandfather experience and more about the making of a film.

Accolades 
Since its launch, the film has been selected in various festivals and academies around the world:

The short was part of the world touring screening The Animation Showcase 2021.

References

External links 
 

Annie Award winners
Sundance Film Festival award winners
Animated documentary films
2020 animated films
2020 short films
French animated short films
2020s French films